The Vinelander was an Australian passenger train operated by the Victorian Railways and later V/Line between Melbourne and Mildura from August 1972 until September 1993. Operating overnight along the Mildura line, it included motorail and sleeping car facilities.

History

A trial daylight service, the Mildura Sunlight was introduced by the Victorian Railways between Melbourne and Mildura on 3 September 1957. Air-conditioned Z type carriage stock was used, running thrice weekly.

Night trains replaced this from 1967, and a motorail service was added in 1968.

The Vinelander first ran on 9 August 1972 after intense local lobbying for an upgrade of the existing overnight train. The name was the product of a naming competition held by the Victorian Railways, with steel sleeping cars formerly used on The Overland being used, along with older wooded stock. A buffet car and bar was added to the train from 18 July 1977, but drunken behaviour became an issue, with offending passengers being removed from the train at intermediate stations. The typical timetable of the 1970s had a Melbourne departure at 21:20 and an arrival into Mildura at 08:05.

The train was promoted as one of the Victorian Railways' premier trains, in 1974 Victorian Railways sponsored a race meeting of the Mildura Racing Club, with the winner receiving the Vinelander Plate.

In 1984 a parallel road coach commenced operations. A day train named The Sunraysia commenced in 1987 but was withdrawn in 1990.

By November 1986, The Vinelander was only operating two nights per week, with The Sunraysia daylight service running as a replacement on some other days. The price of the sleeping car service also rose; from $17 per berth in 1985, it had risen to $30 per berth by July 1986. Staff levels were also reduced, with one conductor to manage two carriages (prior to this it was a one-to-one ratio). This was seen by some as an attempt by V/Line management to cut back the service.

The last Vinelander ran on 12 September 1993 after the cutbacks of the Kennett Government. A service review was announced by the Bracks Government in 2000, in part due to the independent politician Russell Savage enabling the formation of a minority Labor government after the 1999 Victorian state election. The service never returned.

Withdrawal
The withdrawal of The Vinelander service in 1993 occurred under controversial circumstances. Two days before the service was scheduled to be axed, intending passengers were on the platform at Spencer Street station, ready to board the train to Mildura, when it was announced that it had been cancelled due to a landslide along the track. Despite the very short notice of the cancellation, buses were conveniently available as an alternative. Suspicions about the supposed landslide story were aroused when it was noted that it hadn't blocked the Melbourne-bound Vinelander that same evening.

A leaked document from the train controllers working that evening also aroused suspicion and an investigation revealed that the story about the landslide was a hoax.

V/Line management failed to give any clear explanation for their actions and it is widely believed that the sudden cancellation of the final Vinelander service was done to avoid any protests, such as the one that had taken place earlier at Bairnsdale, when the withdrawal of the service occurred as planned a couple of days later.

References

External links
Victoria's Latest Named Train, "The Vinelander", advertising poster from November 1972, Public Record Office Victoria.

Named passenger trains of Victoria (Australia)
Night trains of Australia
Railway services introduced in 1972
Railway services discontinued in 1993
1972 establishments in Australia
1993 disestablishments in Australia
Discontinued railway services in Australia
Motorail